In Norse mythology, Andvaranaut (12th c. Old Norse: , "Andvari's Gift"), first owned by Andvari, is a magic ring that could help with finding sources of gold.

The mischievous god Loki stole Andvari's treasure and the ring. In revenge, Andvari cursed the ring to bring misfortune and destruction to whoever possessed it. Loki quickly gave the cursed Andvaranaut to Hreidmar, King of the Dwarves, as reparation for having inadvertently killed Hreidmar's son, Ótr. Ótr's brother, Fafnir, then murdered Hreidmar and took the ring, turning into a dragon to guard it. Sigurd (Siegfried) later killed Fafnir and gave Andvaranaut to Brynhildr (Brünnehilde). Queen Grimhild of the Nibelungs then manipulated Sigurd and Brynhildr into marrying her children, bringing Andvaranaut's curse into her family.

See also
 Rings in Germanic cultures

References

Nibelung tradition
Artifacts in Norse mythology
Mythological clothing
Völsung cycle
Individual rings
Magic rings
Loki